Marcus Singletary is an American media personality and musician. A prolific entertainer, he has released many albums as a solo artist, and appeared on several radio and television programs. An article published in Illinois Entertainer cited Marcus Singletary as an early pioneer within the home recording revolution of the 2000s.

Music
Singletary was born in Chicago, Illinois. He began playing several instruments from an early age, and later described the era as one spent listening to classic rock radio and hanging out at a local record shop.

A unique blend of styles have been apparent within Singletary's recording career. Take Me Out to the Ball Game (2008), which consisted largely of improvisational guitar solos, was compared, by critics, to legends like Jimi Hendrix, the Rocks compilation (2006) was a "recorded blues resume" containing early cuts and highlights, and Smokin''' (2011) paired him with a powerhouse backing band including Chet McCracken, a Grammy nominee and former member of Rock and Roll Hall of Fame band The Doobie Brothers, on drums. Others, including Defiance Science (2015) and Subversive Blues (2016), were displays of his talents on all instruments.

In reference to his work as a songwriter, he said, "The characters I write about represent different aspects of real people. They make their choices, live with their decisions, and find inspiration in the aftermath."

Education
Marcus Singletary studied jazz guitar and audio engineering at Musician's Institute, and is a graduate of Northwestern University's School of Communication.

Business
Singletary formed the independent record label Aviation Records in 2006. It focused on Americana, fusion, and progressive rock. He and the label were awarded a California small business grant by Governor Gavin Newsom and the State Legislature in February, 2021. In an interview, he said, "Eventually, our collective attention will turn away from the pandemic, just as audiences’ tastes in popular music change, over time. This opportunity ensures that we will continue to press on with our goals of teaching the world about - and placing a modern spin on - some important forms of music that have, in recent times, been largely ignored."

Multimedia Work
Marcus Singletary interviews and performances have aired on television networks including CBS, CNN, and FOX. As an author, he has contributed to such publications as Examiner and Guitar 9.

He hosted the radio program Far Out Flavors in 2016; it was broadcast on Southern California NBC affiliate KCAA-FM. Highlights were featured on the 2017 EP Daydream Station.

Marcus Singletary has voiced radio advertisements for companies including Disc Makers, Carrie's Barbecue Restaurant, and BandsOnABudget.com. 
He produced and scored the 2019 experimental short film The Sebhedris Experience. It combined kaleidoscopic images with ambient music from the instrumental soundtrack Journey to Sebhedris.

Discography

Studio albums
 The Marcus Singletary Band (2004)
 Capitol Hill (2004)
 Marcus Singletary (2008)
 Smokin'  (2011)
 Defiance Science (2015)
 Subversive Blues (2016)
 Born to Be Wild (2020)

EPs
 Sings Country Music Standards (2012)
 Spirit Dialogues (2017)
 Daydream Station (2018)
 Power Player (2021)

Instructional
 Advanced Guitar For All Ages (2023)

Soundtrack albums
 Journey to Sebhedris (2019)

Compilations
 Rocks (2006)
 In the Mix (2018)
 My Gun's My Guitar (2019)
 The Complete Aviation Studio Albums (2004-2020) (2021)
 Start Something (2022)
 Early Works (2022)

Live albums
 Live at the Foxx (2005)
 Live on Sunset (2006)
 Take Me Out to the Ball Game (2008)
 Marcus Singletary Live (2015)
 The Sonic Admiral - Live!'' (2018)

External links
Marcus Singletary : Official Website
Marcus Singletary Dot Com on YouTube
 
 
 
Marcus Singletary on IMDb

References 

American rock musicians
Record producers from Illinois
American rock guitarists
American male guitarists
American rock songwriters
American rock singers
Singers from Chicago
Northwestern University School of Communication alumni
Musicians Institute alumni
Singer-songwriters from California
Living people
Guitarists from Los Angeles
Guitarists from Chicago
Record producers from California
Year of birth missing (living people)
American male singer-songwriters
Singer-songwriters from Illinois